The Rockhill Agricultural Historic District is a historic district located north of Pittstown along County Route 513 in a southern triangular portion of Union Township, Hunterdon County, New Jersey. The district was added to the National Register of Historic Places on April 5, 1984 for its significance in agriculture during the 18th and 19th centuries.

Gallery

See also
 Pittstown Historic District

References

External links
 

Union Township, Hunterdon County, New Jersey
National Register of Historic Places in Hunterdon County, New Jersey
Historic districts on the National Register of Historic Places in New Jersey
New Jersey Register of Historic Places